Nisoscolopocerus apiculatus is a species of leaf-footed bug in the family Coreidae. It is found in North America.

References

Coreini
Articles created by Qbugbot
Insects described in 1928